Luís Manuel Teixeira Sá (born 17 March 1981) is a Portuguese athlete specialising in the 110 metres hurdles. He represented his country at the 2004 Summer Olympics failing to qualify for the second round.

He has personal bests of 13.62 for the 110 metres hurdles (2004) and 7.79 for the 60 metres hurdles (2003).
Nowadays he is a special member of Resistente's club

Competition record

References

1981 births
Living people
Portuguese male hurdlers
Olympic athletes of Portugal
Athletes (track and field) at the 2004 Summer Olympics